San José is a district of the Naranjo canton, in the Alajuela province of Costa Rica. The village of San Juanillo is located in the district.

Geography 
San José has an area of  km² and an elevation of  metres.

Demographics 

For the 2011 census, San José had a population of  inhabitants.

Transportation

Road transportation 
The district is covered by the following road routes:
 National Route 141
 National Route 703
 National Route 704

References 

Districts of Alajuela Province
Populated places in Alajuela Province